The pair skating competition of the 2018 Winter Olympics was held at the Gangneung Ice Arena in Gangneung, South Korea. The short program was held on 14 February and the free skating on 15 February 2018. Aljona Savchenko and Bruno Massot became Olympic champions after finishing fourth in the short program and setting a record with their score in the free program to take the gold by 0.43 points. Sui Wenjing and Han Cong, leading after the short program, made a couple of mistakes in the free program and won silver. Meagan Duhamel and Eric Radford were third. This was the second Olympics since 1964 that a Soviet or Russian pair did not win a medal.

Chinese judges Chen Weiguang and Huang Feng were investigated by the ISU and banned for mark manipulation.

Records 

For a complete list of figure skating records, see list of highest scores in figure skating.

The following new best score was set during this competition:

Qualification 

A total of 22 teams qualified to compete for the event, with each country allowed to only enter a maximum of three. Originally only 20 spots were available, but due to the invitation of the North and South Korean teams, the quota jumped to 22. 16 quotas were handed out during the 2017 World Figure Skating Championships and four were given out at the 2017 CS Nebelhorn Trophy. Each country decided the entry of its teams, and athletes winning the quota were not necessarily granted the right to compete. The South Korean were given an additional quota as host nation, after they failed to qualify through the World Championships or Nebelhorn Trophy. North Korea, who originally qualified at the Nebelhorn Trophy, did not register its athletes in time. However, after the country agreed to participate in the games, the International Olympic Committee (IOC) allowed the pair to compete. All pairs competing must have met the minimum total elements score, which does not include component scores. For the short program this was 20.00 and the free skate 36.00.

Schedule 
All times are (UTC+9).

Results

Short program 
The short program was held on 14 February.

Free skating 
The free skating was held on 15 February.

Overall 
The skaters are ranked according to their overall score.

TP - Total points; SP - Short program; FS - Free skating

References

Citations 

Pairs
2018
Mixed events at the 2018 Winter Olympics
2018 in figure skating